Sin Ik-hui (Hangul: 신익히, hanja: 申翼熙) (9 June 1894 – 5 May 1956) was a Korean independence activist and politician during the period of Japanese rule. He was Speaker of the National Assembly during President Syngman Rhee's first term (4 August 1948 and 30 May 1950) and second term (19 June 1950 and 30 May 1954). His nickname was Haegong (해공, 海公) or Haehu (해후; 海候); his courtesy name was Yeogu (여구; 如耉).

Life 
Sin Ik-hui was a descendant of Sin Rip and Sin Kyung-hee, Sin Saimdang. He was born in Samaru country in Gwangju, Gyeonggi Province. He became an orphan and his second elder half-brother Sin Kyu-hee nurtured him. In his early years, he studied abroad in Japan.

In 1918, he was exiled to Shanghai in China, in April 1919.

Politician
He was involved in the creation of the Provisional National Assembly of Koreas. He was elected as a Congressman of the Provisional National Assembly of Korea. On April 23, he was appointed to Vice minister of Foreign Affairs of Provisional Government of Korea.

In August 1919, Sin became vice Minister of Justice and in September, he was appointed as Justice Minister and in September 1920, Minister of Foreign Affairs. In 1930s he became an English professor at a Chinese University.

In May 1940 he was appointed to Provisional Government of Korea, and in 1944 he was reappointed to Interior Minister to the Provisional Government.

In May 1948 he was elected Congressman of National Assembly of Korea. On August 4, 1948 he was 2nd term head of First Republic and 19 June 1950, he again was Speaker until 30 May 1954.

In 1955 he was involved with the founding of the Democratic Party and elected as its fourth leader. In 1956 he ran for president, but died of heart failure and overwork at age 64. He had boarded a train to Seoul with John Chang to commence campaigning soon after registration of candidates had closed. Minutes after taking their seats however, Sin became violently ill. He rushed to the toilet, but died.

See also 
 National Assembly of Korea
 Provisional National Assembly of Korea
 Provisional Government of Korea
 Syngman Rhee
 Kim Gu
 Kim Kyu-sik
 Chang Myon

References

External links 

 Sin Ik-hui 
 Haegong Sin Ik-hui memorial museum 
 Haegong Sin Ik-hui memorial association 
 SamWorld 
 Sin Ik-hui:Navercast 

1894 births
1956 deaths
People from Gwangju, Gyeonggi
South Korean civil rights activists
Korean expatriates in the United States
Korean independence activists
Anti-Japanese sentiment in Korea
South Korean anti-communists
Korean revolutionaries
Democratic Party (South Korea, 1955) politicians
Speakers of the National Assembly (South Korea)
Waseda University alumni
Sin clan of Pyongsan